The 2006–07 season was FK Partizan's 1st season in Serbian SuperLiga. This article shows player statistics and all matches (official and friendly) that the club played during the 2006–07 season.

Players

Squad information

Squad statistics

Transfers

In

Out

Loan out

Competitions

Overview

Serbian SuperLiga

First stage

Championship round

UEFA Cup

See also
 List of FK Partizan seasons

References

External links
 Official website
 Partizanopedia 2006-2007  (in Serbian)

FK Partizan seasons
Partizan